Flyriella stanfordii is a Mexican species of plants in the family Asteraceae. It is native to the States of Nuevo León, Tamaulipas in northeastern Mexico.

Flyriella stanfordii grows amidst luxuriant vegetation in moist canyons. Its stem is covered with long hairs. One plant will produce numerous flower heads tightly packed into a flat-topped array. Each head has 20-23 white disc flowers but no ray flowers.

References

Eupatorieae
Plants described in 1972
Flora of Northeastern Mexico